The Chairman of the Estates of Suriname was the presiding officer of the Estates of Suriname.

List of chairmen
The following is a complete list of office-holders 1935–1975:

Political parties

See also
 List of chairmen of the National Assembly of Suriname
 List of colonial governors of Suriname

References

Suriname
Lists of political office-holders in Suriname